is a Japanese football player. She plays for Omiya Ardija Ventus. She played for Japan national team.

Club career
Uetsuji was born in Suita on November 30, 1987. She played for her local club Speranza FC Takatsuki from 2003 to 2004. In 2006, she joined TEPCO Mareeze. However, the club was disbanded for Fukushima Daiichi nuclear disaster in 2011. In May, she moved to Albirex Niigata. In 2012, she moved to new club Vegalta Sendai. In 2015, she moved to Nippon TV Beleza. She played as regular player from 2015. However her  opportunity to play decreased in 2018. In 2019, she moved to Chifure AS Elfen Saitama.

National team career
On April 5, 2012, Uetsuji debuted for Japan national team against Brazil. She played 4 games for Japan until 2015.

National team statistics

References

External links

Japan Football Association
Nippon TV Beleza

1987 births
Living people
Association football people from Osaka Prefecture
People from Suita
Japanese women's footballers
Japan women's international footballers
Nadeshiko League players
Speranza Osaka-Takatsuki players
TEPCO Mareeze players
Albirex Niigata Ladies players
Mynavi Vegalta Sendai Ladies players
Nippon TV Tokyo Verdy Beleza players
Chifure AS Elfen Saitama players
Women's association football midfielders